Medinilla cummingii, the chandelier tree, is a species of flowering plant in the family Melastomataceae, native to mossy forest in the Philippines at  altitude. Fruits are 5–7 mm in diameter, pink to purplish to bluish-black when ripe.

Etymology
Medinilla is named for José de Medinilla y Pineda, who was governor of Mauritius (then known as the Marianne Islands) in 1820.

References 

 Pacific Island Ecosystems at Risk (PIER) entry

cummingii
Endemic flora of the Philippines
Flora of the Philippines